Colonel Thomas Aspinwall (1786–1876) was the second-longest-serving United States consul, holding that position in London from 1816–1854.

Biography
Thomas was born to Dr. William Aspinwall and Susanna Gardner in Brookline, Massachusetts on May 23, 1786.

He matriculated at Harvard College in 1804 and graduated three years later, delivering the Latin valedictory address.

In the War of 1812, Aspinwall was appointed major of the Ninth Regiment, U.S. Infantry. In 1813 he was made a lieutenant-colonel and eventually a colonel on account of his valor in the battle of Sackett Harbor. In September 1814, during the Siege of Fort Erie, he sustained an injury to his left arm that required an amputation. In recognition of his service, President Madison appointed him consul to London during a recess, and he was confirmed at the beginning of the subsequent legislative session.

While in London, Aspinwall acted as a literary agent and a liaison between American authors and British publishers. The American historian and Hispanist William Prescott, for instance, engaged with him in this capacity, as did Washington Irving, who was a close friend. He also procured books for Americans unable to do so, as for instance in the case of the abolitionist Lewis Tappan.

He married Louise Elizabeth Poignand on February 13, 1814, and they had seven children.

Aspinwall died August 11, 1876 at his home in Boston. He was buried at Walnut Street Cemetery.

Notes

References

Campaniolo, Jennifer, Legendary Locals of Brookline. Charleston: Arcadia Publishing, 2014. 65.
Georgetown University Archives notes.

Winthrop, Robert C., Addresses and Speeches on Various Occasions, from 1869–1879. Boston: Little, Brown, 1879. 432–435.

Harvard College alumni
1786 births
1876 deaths
People from Brookline, Massachusetts
American consuls
Literary agents